Shortfoot Creek is a stream in the U.S. states of North Dakota and South Dakota.

Shortfoot Creek has the name of a member of the Sioux tribe.

See also
List of rivers of North Dakota
List of rivers of South Dakota

References

Rivers of Sargent County, North Dakota
Rivers of Marshall County, South Dakota
Rivers of North Dakota
Rivers of South Dakota